Tewfik Allal is a French trade unionist born on October 11, 1947, in Oujda in Morocco. He is a writer and a prominent political figure. He is the president of the association Manifeste des libertés.

Books
Situations migratoires—La fonction-miroir (Editions Galilée, 1977, with Jean-Pierre Buffard, Michel Marié, and Tomaso Regazzola)

See also
Politics of Morocco

References

French essayists
French male writers
Male essayists
1947 births
Living people
People from Oujda
21st-century French writers